Miconia demissifolia is a species of plant in the family Melastomataceae. It is endemic to Peru.

References

demissifolia
Endemic flora of Peru
Vulnerable flora of South America
Taxonomy articles created by Polbot